National Green Week is an annual campaign, started by the Green Education Foundation (GEF), that kicks off during the first week in February and lasts through the end of April. Schools and groups are encouraged to take this opportunity to spend time with students discussing sustainability topics and exploring ways they can make a difference. Participants select one of GEF's six sustainability themes to be their Green Week theme. Each program includes free lessons, activities, audits and contests. Free sustainability themed programs include I Ride Green, Green Energy Challenge, Green Thumb Challenge, Sustainable Water Challenge, Waste Reduction Challenge and the Green Building Program. In 2013, National Green Week is sponsored by the Sprint Foundation.

“By participating in National Green Week, students will learn that simple decisions such as the selection of waste-free snacks and drinks can combat monumental environmental problems,” says Victoria Waters, President and Founder, Green Education Foundation. “Children are in the best position to impact the future of our environment by developing green behaviors that become lifelong habits,” adds Waters.

Green Education Foundation (GEF) is a non-profit organization committed to creating a sustainable future through education. Sustainability education provides educators with the real-world applied learning models that connect science, technology, and math education with the broader human concerns of environmental, economic, and social systems. GEF provides curriculum and resources to K-12 students and teachers worldwide with the goal of challenging them to think holistically and critically about global environmental concerns and solutions.

National Green Week was conceived based on the results of the Fisher Green School Experiment. WALPOLE, MA — June 2008 — the first ever GEF “Green School Experiment” at a special event at the Fisher Elementary School in North Walpole, Mass. The educational program was introduced to students and faculty on June 3, 2008, and challenged them to adopt simple “green” habits to reduce their classroom waste by 50 percent.

Using their new IXG Green Packs — reusable water bottle, drink thermos, snack containers, organic cotton tee shirt, reusable shopping bag, bottle brush cleaner and instructional insert — Fisher Elementary students had the opportunity to experience firsthand how much of an impact these simple habits can have. In fact, their efforts far surpassed the Experiment's goal, reducing classroom waste by an astounding 70 percent. Combined overall school waste was reduced by an equally impressive 53 percent.
An additional pilot was run in December 2008, at Weymouth Search Elementary School in Weymouth Massachusetts.

National Green Week 2009, the Green Education Foundation's enlisted 2000 schools and nearly a half a million students nationwide. Over 250,000 participated in the "Waste-Free Snacks challenge, effectively eliminating over 100,000 lbs of trash including 1 million students which, according to WCVB TV, would reduce trash going to landfills by 2 million pounds for the very first National Green Week. By the end of the 2009 National Green Week, a total of more than 500,000 children in 900 schools across 48 states participated to reduce waste and promote sustainability. so we are requested to save earth

National Green Week Pilot Schools

The Fisher Green School Experiment
Students at Fisher Elementary School in Walpole, Massachusetts, conducted a trash experiment.  For two weeks they collected and weighed their trash, including juice boxes and snack wrappers.  The school collected 450 lbs. of trash a day. Then they received a "Green Pack", which was itself a reusable shopping bag, and included a water bottle and reusable snack containers.  They were able to reduce their trash by 70% using these "Green Packs"  Teacher Lisa Grasso's third grade class in particular recorded less than an ounce of trash in 2 weeks.

The William Seach Green Week
Like the students at Fisher Elementary, students at William Search Elementary in Weymouth, Massachusetts, weighed their trash.  The school of 370 students collected 25 lbs. of trash a day.  After receiving green packs, they reduced their trash by 86% to 3.4 lbs. of trash a day.  Town employees were also encouraged to reduce waste by Weymouth Mayor Sue Kay.  "That brings the parents into it. They kind of get into it with creating the lunches. And if we show our employees that the children are participating, then why can't we do it also?"

Bibliography

External links
  National Green Week
  Green Education Foundation
  IXG

Awareness weeks in the United States
February observances
March observances
April observances